Regehr is a surname. Notable people with the name include:

 Duncan Regehr (born 1952), Canadian stage, film and television actor
 Ernie Regehr, Canadian peace researcher
 John Regehr, American computer science professor
 Kaitlyn Regehr, Canadian ethnographer and broadcaster
 Richie Regehr (born 1983), Canadian ice hockey defenceman
 Robyn Regehr (born 1980), Canadian ice hockey defenceman
 Wade Regehr, Canadian neurobiology professor

See also
 Reger, surname